NGC 3435 is a barred spiral galaxy located about 235 million light-years from the Milky Way, and is about 125 000 light-years across. It can be found in the constellation Ursa Major. It was discovered on 9 April 1793 by astronomer William Herschel.

The galaxy has the surface brightness equal to 14.04 mag/Minute and second of arcam², which classifiers it as low surface brightness galaxy (LSB).

Supernova 
On 29 March 1999, in the galaxy was observed the type Ia supernova, designated as SN 1999bh. It was discovered by W. Li, as part of the Lick Observatory Supernova Search (LOSS) program by the Lick Observatory.

References

External links
 
 

Barred spiral galaxies
Ursa Major
3454
6025
32786
Astronomical objects discovered in 1793
Interacting galaxies